Making Treaty 7 is an arts collective that stemmed from the Calgary's nomination as one of the Cultural Capitals of Canada in 2012. The collective seeks to draw attention on the creation of Treaty 7 and its continuing effects on Indigenous populations of Alberta, in hopes of dispelling misunderstandings, myths and falsities that originate from a lack of awareness.  The collective produces works of art and theatre projects to encourage greater attention to this ongoing dialogue.

Formation 
Making Treaty 7 was created as a part of the Calgary 2012 winning bid for the Cultural Capitals of Canada project. When Calgary 2012 finished its run, Making Treaty 7 filed for Non-profit status and has continued to host events, put on theatre productions and educate the public on Indigenous affairs, human rights issues and the culture and identity of historic and present Indigenous peoples.

Mandate 
Making Treaty 7 is a not for profit organization that implements various methods to improve the public's appreciation for First Nations culture, identity and diversity. Making Treaty 7 uses several artistic mediums to educate people, entice more tourism, and accentuate cultural understanding.

Membership 
Board of directors: Dr. Andrew Bear Robe (board chair, Siksika Nation), Kelli Morning Bull (vice chair, Piikani Nation), Dr. Genevieve Fox (treasurer, Kainaiwa Nation), Carol Mason (secretary, Kainaiwa Nation), Joyce Doore (director, Siksika Nation), Autumn Eagle Speaker (director, Kainaiwa), Hal Eagletail (director, Tsuut'ina Nation), Amanda Foote (director), Rebekah Whitely (director).

Team Members: Justiny Many Fingers (artistic director), Oli Siska (managing director), Sue Scott (Project Manager), Nora Dubois (Office Administrator).

Events 
Making Treaty 7 Cultural Festival, an annual festival to celebrate Indigenous creatives and art. It hosts a historic recreation of the signing of Treaty 7 and then carries on the narrative to present day experience.

150 Acts of Reconciliation, before the 150th anniversary of Canada, members of Making Treaty 7 wrote a list of 150 actions that would allow for a greater understanding between cultures.

Making Treaty 7 Vignettes, a compilation of scenes from Making Treaty 7 that express human rights issues experienced because of the ramifications faced by the Indigenous peoples of Treaty 7.

Visual Arts, in September 2018, Making Treaty 7 hosted its first Visual Arts Exhibit showcasing pieces created by Indigenous artists.

Theatre productions 
Kaahsinnoniks (Our Ancestors), a performance that revisits the signing of Treaty 7 with emphasis being put on the fundamental ideas that it proposed and the following up with the realities faced by the Indigenous nations that signed it.

Kiitistsinnoniks (Our Mothers), an all-female performance that tells the stories of several Indigenous women both past and present and draws attention to the missing and murdered Indigenous women and girls around Canada.

Partnerships and funding

Indigenous community partners 
 Treaty 7 Management Corporation
 Aboriginal Friendship Centre of Calgary
 Native Centre at University of Calgary
 Aboriginal Futures Career & Training Centre
 Alberta Aboriginal Arts

Non-indigenous community partners 
 Banff Centre
 One Yellow Rabbit
 Heritage Park
 Alberta Theatre Projects
 Fort Calgary
 Glenbow Museum
 Suncor, RBC.

Government and public funding 
 Alberta Aboriginal Relations
 Alberta Culture
 Alberta Foundation for the Arts
 Alberta Human Rights Commission
 Alberta Tourism- Parks and Recreation
 Calgary 2012
 Calgary Arts Development 
 The Calgary Foundation
 Canada Council for the Arts
 Canadian Heritage.

See also 

 Treaty 7
 Blackfoot Crossing
 Alberta Theatre Projects
 Missing and murdered Indigenous women

References 

Canadian artist groups and collectives
Theatre in Calgary